Aliabad (also Romanized as ‘Alīābād) is a village in Senderk Rural District, Senderk District, Minab County, Hormozgan Province, Iran. At the 2006 census, its population was 216, in 52 families.

References 

Populated places in Minab County